Zoran may refer to:

 Zoran, a masculine South Slavic name
(includes a list of people with this name)
 Zoran or Tzoran, an Israeli town, now part of Kadima-Zoran
 Zoran Corporation, a digital entertainment and digital imaging semiconductor company
 Zoran (designer), the professional name of fashion designer Zoran Ladicorbic (born 1947)

See also
Zorin (disambiguation)